The Kama Ruijie is a series of vans and trucks produced since November 2019 by Kama Automobile Company (山东凯马汽车制造有限公司). The Ruijie is available as the V and S series, with bodystyles including the V16 pickup and S6 sealed panel van. 

The Kama Ruijie S6 sealed panel van is also the base vehicle for the Dongfeng Yufeng EM26 (东风御风 EM26) pure electric logistics panel van under the agreement between Kama and Dongfeng. The cooperation was between the Kama Automobile Company Ganzhou branch (凯马汽车制造有限公司赣州分公司) and Dongfeng Automobile Company New Energy Division (东风汽车股份有限公司新能源事业部), with Kama supplying the vehicle bodies and Dongfeng doing the final assembly. The final product was built for the logistics industry and is fully electric while sharing the design with the Ruijie panel van.

Overview

The Kama Ruijie panel vans feature 5.4 cubic meters of capacity and a 3050mm wheelbase for maximum cargo area, while the pickup variant features a 3600mm wheelbase. The Kama Ruijie is powered by a 1.6 liter "DAM16KR" engine supplied by Dongan and fulfills the Chinese National VI Emissions Standard developing 90KW and 158N·m. 

As of 2021, the Kama Ruijie panel vans are only available as electric variants while the V16 pickups are still offered as gasoline models.

Dongfeng Yufeng EM26
The Dongfeng Yufeng EM26 (东风御风 EM26) pure electric logistics panel van sold by Dongfeng Automobile Company is a rebadged electric variant of the Kama Ruijie. The Dongfeng Yufeng EM26 has a 42kWh Lithium Iron Phosphate Battery that is capable of a pure electric range of 220km. The Yufeng EM26 has a top speed of 90 km/hr.

New Gonow Shuailing
The New Gonow Shuailing (新吉奥 帅凌) pure electric logistics panel van sold by New Gonow is another rebadged electric variant of the Kama Ruijie.  The New Gonow Shuailing has 41.6kWh and 49.8kWh Lithium Iron Phosphate Batteries that is capable of pure electric range of 290km and 330km respectively. The version produced by New Gonow features restyled front bumpers. New Gonow was founded in 2016 and only started to launch new products in the middle of 2021, with most businesses in the converted RV and camper market and electric logistics van market.

Wanxiang T01
The Wanxiang T01 (万象 T01) pure electric logistics panel van sold by Shanghai Wanxiang Automobile Co., Ltd. is another rebadged electric variant of the Kama Ruijie. The Wanxiang T01 was launched in August 2022 with a completely restyled front end and tail lamps. The Wanxiang T01 has a 38.016kWh Lithium Iron Phosphate Batteries that is capable of pure electric range of 240km. The electric motor has a maximum output of 70kW and 230N·m.

References

External links

Rear-wheel-drive vehicles
Vans
Cars introduced in 2019
Cars introduced in 2020
2020s cars
Cars of China
Production electric cars